The club has now changed its name back to Bolton Ladies.

Previously the club represented Bolton Wanderers are a women's football team in England founded in 1983 who play their home games at Kensite Stadium 

This team currently is playing in the Women's National League Northern One (tier 4).

Games Played

References

Women's football clubs in England
Bolton Wanderers F.C.